Maryland Million Oaks was an American Thoroughbred horse race held annually from 1986 thru 2012 primarily at Laurel Park Racecourse in Laurel, Maryland or at Pimlico Race Course in Baltimore. To be eligible for the Maryland Million Oaks, a horse had to be sired by a stallion who stands in Maryland. Due to that restriction the race is classified as a non-graded or "listed" stakes race and is not eligible for grading by the American Graded Stakes Committee.

The race was part of Maryland Million Day, a 12-race program held in mid October that was the creation of renowned television sports journalist Jim McKay. The "Maryland Million" is the first State-Bred showcase for Thoroughbreds. Since 1986, 27 other events in 20 states have imitated the showcase and its structure.

The race was run at  miles in 1991, 1992, 2001, 2002 and 2004. It was run as the Omni International Maryland Oaks in 1986 and 1987. From 1990 through 1993 the race was called the Challedon Society Maryland Oaks. It was called the Baltimore Magazine Maryland Oaks between 1995 and 1998. The metropolitan newspaper sponsored the race from 1999 through 2002 and it was called the Baltimore Sun Maryland Oaks. In 2004 the race was called the Cosequin Maryland Oaks and in 2007 the race was called the Maryland Lottery Oaks.

In its 24th running in 2009, the race was restricted to those horses who were sired by a stallion who stands in the state of Maryland. Both the entrant horse and their stallion had to be nominated to the Maryland Million program.

Records 
Speed record: 
 1 mile (8 furlongs) : 1:36.40 - Love That Dance (2009)
  miles (9 furlongs) : 1:43.80 - Silmaril (2004)

Most wins by a jockey:
 3 - Edgar S. Prado   (1993, 1996, 1998)

Most wins by a trainer:
 3 - Anthony W. Dutrow  (1999, 2002, 2006)

Most wins by an owner:
 1 - 25 different owners tied with one

Winners

See also 
 Maryland Million Oaks top three finishers
 Maryland Million Day
 Laurel Park Racecourse

References

 Maryland Thoroughbred official website

Discontinued horse races
Horse races in Maryland
Laurel Park Racecourse
Recurring sporting events established in 1986
Recurring sporting events disestablished in 2013